Nagyszakácsi is a village in Somogy county, Hungary.

Sightseeings 

The famous contest of medieval Chefs are organized every year, during the summer season.

External links 
 Street map (Hungarian)
 Homepage of Nagyszakácsi
 https://web.archive.org/web/20110721110214/http://www.kiralyiszakacsok.hu/

References 

Populated places in Somogy County